The 54th Venice Biennale was an international contemporary art exhibition held in 2011. The Venice Biennale takes place biennially in Venice, Italy. Artistic director Bice Curiger curated its central exhibition, "ILLUMInations".

Awards 

 Golden Lion for best artist of the exhibition: Christian Marclay
 Silver Lion for the most promising young artist of the exhibition: Haroon Mirza
 Golden Lions for lifetime achievement: Sturtevant and Franz West
 Golden Lion for best national participation: German pavilion with Christoph Schlingensief

References

Further reading 

 
 
 
 
 
 
 
 
 
 
 
 
 
 
 
 
 
 
 
 
 
 
 
 
 
 
 
 https://www.washingtonpost.com/entertainment/museums/venice-biennale-an-ambitious-but-typically-overblown-international-art-festival/2011/06/14/AGQA75YH_story.html

2011 in art
2011 in Italy
Venice Biennale exhibitions